Aliyasantana, literally "nephew as heir" in Kanarese, is the matrilineal system of inheritance practiced by Tuluver community in the Tulunaad area of Karnataka, India. It is similar to the Marumakkathayam system of the Malabar region.
Nephew here means brother's sister's son.

Origins

Myth of origin
The popular belief is that it had its source in the law promulgated by Bhūtāla-Pāndya, the sovereign prince who ruled this country at one time and that it was for the first time introduced by him. The popular version of it is contained in the Memorandum submitted to the Malabar Marriage
Commission by one of its members, Mr. Mundappa Bangēra. "The Bhūtāla-Pandya's Aliya-santāna Law” shows that it was introduced by a despotic prince called Bhūtāla-Pāndya about the year 77 A.D., superseding the makkala-santana or inheritance from father to son which then prevailed (in what is now South Kanara). It is said that when the maternal uncle of Dēva-Pāņdya wanted to launch his newly constructed ships with valuable cargo in them, Kundōdara, king of demons,
demanded a human sacrifice. Déva-Pāņdya asked his wife's permission to offer one of his sons but she refused, while his sister, Satyāvati, offered her son Jaya-Pandya, for the purpose. Kundōdara, discovering in the
child signs of future greatness, waived the sacrifice and permitted the ships to sail. He then took the child, restored to him his father's kingdom of Jayantikā, and gave him the name Bhūtāļa-Pāņdya. Subsequently,
when some of the ships brought immense wealth, the demon again appeared
and demanded of Dēva-Pāņdya another human sacrifice. He again consulted his wife, she refused to comply with the request and
publicly renounced her title and that of her children to the valuable property brought in the ships. Kundādara, then demanded Deva-
Pāņdya, to disinherit his sons of the wealth which had been brought in those ships, as also of the kingdom and to bestow all, on his sister's son
the above named Jaya-Pāņdya or Bhūtāla-Pāņdya. This was accordingly
done. And as this prince inherited his kingdom from his maternal uncle
and not from his father, he ruled that his own examples must be followed
by his subjects and it was, thus, that the aliya-santāna system was established
on the 3rd Māgha śudha of the year 1 of the era of Sālivāhana called Išvara
about A.D.77. This Bhūtāļa-Pandya, it is said, ruled for 75 years and his nephew, Vidyadyumna-Pāņdya, for 81 years and the like.

Salient features

The child is a part of the mothers family
The inheritance of lineage identity in the form of gotra or in the form of ancestral house is through the mother. Marriage between same "gotra" was prohibited.
Inheritance is matrilineal, but in all aspects the husband is the head of the household. All Tuluvas practiced patriarchal system of living.
The Mama is generally the male head of the family and was known as "Gurikare" in Tulu, means Yajamana in Kannada.
Among Tuluvas, brothers usually manage the matrilineal family land on behalf of his sister.

Matrilineal communities
Tuluva sub-groups which practised a matrilineal system of inheritance included:

 Bunts, including the Jain Bunt
 Billava
 Kulala
 Devadiga
 Mogaveera

See also
 Matrilineality
 Matrilineal succession

References

 Analysis of the 1931 Census of India

Tuluva
Kerala society
Karnataka society
Bunt (community)
Hindu law